Piscidia is a genus of flowering plants in subfamily Faboideae of the legume family, Fabaceae. The generic name is derived from the Latin words piscis, meaning "fish," and caedo, meaning "to kill." It refers to the use of extracts from the plant to poison fish.

Selected species
 Piscidia carthagenensis Jacq.
 Piscidia grandifolia (Donn.Sm.) I.M.Johnst.
 Piscidia mollis Rose
 Piscidia piscipula (L.) Sarg.

Formerly placed here
 Sesbania punicea (Cav.) Benth. (as P. punicea Cav.)

References

External links

Millettieae
Fabaceae genera
Taxa named by Carl Linnaeus